"Boys with Emotions" is a song by Swedish singer Felix Sandman. The song was performed for the first time in Melodifestivalen 2020, where it made it to the final through the Second Chance round. Sandman finished at seventh place with the song, scoring a total of 67 points.

Charts

References

Songs written by Felix Sandman
2020 singles
English-language Swedish songs
Melodifestivalen songs of 2020
Felix Sandman songs